The Capital News Service (CNS) is a wire service based at Michigan State University in East Lansing, Michigan. CNS covers news at the state capital in Lansing and across Michigan for member papers from September to early May. The circulation of the combined member papers is one of the largest in the state—larger than the Detroit Free Press. The service is headed by Eric Freedman, a Pulitzer-winning reporter formerly of The Detroit News. Correspondents are selected from undergraduate and master's students within the School of Journalism and College of Communication Arts and Sciences by an application process. During each semester, correspondents report on state government, politics and public policy for daily and weekly newspapers and online news outlets across Michigan. 

Articles on topics ranging from prison reform and education budgeting to environmental issues. Story ideas for these articles and the shorter weekly pieces are gathered from individual research, as well as weekly newsmakers sessions. These unofficial “press conferences” feature speakers from different state government departments and policy groups. Past conference speakers have included the Department of Health and Human Services, the Michigan United Conservation Clubs and the Michigan League for Public Policy, among others.

History
CNS was founded in 1981 by Michigan Journalism Hall of Fame member Dick Milliman, formerly of the Milliman Newspaper Group. The course, created as part of the MSU School of Journalism, was originally called the MSU Capitol News Bureau. It emphasized writing for publication and focused on less glamorous breaking news that could be localized. The pilot program, taught by Milliman, was made up of 10 students and 10 subscribing newspapers. Since 1981, the wire service has expanded its reach to nearly 40 publications. After Milliman’s work, Bill Cote, formerly of Booth Newspapers, was named coordinator. Cote became a member of the School of Journalism faculty in 1986. Following Cote’s retirement, Professor Eric Freedman, a Pulitzer Prize-winning reporter for the Detroit News, became CNS director. Freedman currently heads the program and teaches it alongside David Poulson, the senior associate director of MSU’s Knight Center for Environmental Journalism.

Publications
CNS currently works with publications including:

Print
 Alcona County Review
 Bay Mills News
Benzie County Record Patriot
 Big Rapids Pioneer
 Blissfield Advance
 Cadillac News
 Cheboygan Daily Tribune
 Clare County Cleaver
 Coldwater Daily Reporter
Corp! Magazine (Warren) 
Crawford County Avalanche
Fowlerville News & Views
 Grand Rapids Business Journal
 (Greenville) Daily News
 Harbor Light (Harbor Springs)
Herald Review (Big Rapids) 
Hillsdale Daily News
 Holland Sentinel
Ionia Sentinel-Standard
Lake County Star (Big Rapids) 
Lansing City Pulse
 Leelanau Enterprise
 Ludington Daily News
 Manistee News Advocate
Michigan Farm News (Lansing) 
 The Mining Journal (Marquette)
Montmorency County Tribune
Oceana Herald Journal
 Petoskey News Review
 Sault Ste. Marie Evening News
 St. Ignace News
 Sturgis Journal
Three Rivers Commercial-News
 Traverse City Record-Eagle

Radio
WKAR Radio

Internet
 Great Lakes Echo
 Gongwer News Service
 Michigan Information and Research Service (MIRS)

References

External links
Capital News Service

Michigan State University
News agencies based in the United States